Kharyasta is a rural locality (an ulus) in Kyakhtinsky District, Republic of Buryatia, Russia. The population was 18 as of 2010. There is 1 street.

Geography 
Kharyasta is located 47 km north of Kyakhta (the district's administrative centre) by road. Novodesyatnikovo is the nearest rural locality.

References 

Rural localities in Kyakhtinsky District